I Sodi is an Italian restaurant in New York City. The restaurant opened in 2008, and was founded by Rita Sodi.

History
Before opening I Sodi, Sodi was an executive at Calvin Klein. The restaurant began serving lunch in 2019. 

Sodi plans to relocate the restaurant, expanding its size in a new location.

Reception
When it opened, the restaurant received positive reviews from critics. In The New York Times, Julia Moskin praised the restaurant, emphasizing the quality of its interior design, service, and the "authentic" menu. Lauren Collins, writing for The New Yorker also praised I Sodi's food and hospitable service.

The restaurant has remained popular with critics and diners. Pete Wells, the restaurant critic for The New York Times, referred to Rita Sodi as "one of the city’s great pasta practitioners" in a 2016 review. In a 2022 review published by Eater, Robert Sietsema wrote that the restaurant "perfectly mimics all aspects of a restaurant in Tuscany".

Food writer Carey Polis has referred to the restaurant as her favorite. I Sodi was first on a 2017 list of "The Absolute Best Italian Restaurants in New York" compiled by Grub Street.

References

2008 establishments in New York City
Italian restaurants in New York City
Christopher Street
Restaurants established in 2008
West Village

External links